Adams Township is one of fourteen townships in Morgan County, Indiana, United States. As of the 2010 census, its population was 1,194 and it contained 502 housing units.

Geography

Unincorporated towns
 Crown Center at 
 Eminence at 
 Little Point at

Cemeteries
The township contains these four cemeteries: Crown Center, Shumaker, Walters and Whitaker-Patrick.

Major highways
  Interstate 70

School districts
 Eminence Community School Corporation

Political districts
 Indiana's 4th congressional district
 State House District 47
 State Senate District 37

References
 
 United States Census Bureau 2008 TIGER/Line Shapefiles
 IndianaMap

External links
 Indiana Township Association
 United Township Association of Indiana
 City-Data.com page for Adams Township

Townships in Morgan County, Indiana
Townships in Indiana